Laurits Grønland (12 June 1887 – 29 March 1957) was a Norwegian politician for the Labour Party.

He was born in Nes, Buskerud.

He was elected to the Norwegian Parliament from Vestfold in 1945, and was re-elected on one occasion. He had previously served in the position of deputy representative during the terms 1931–1933 and 1934–1936.

On the local level Grønland was a member of the executive committee of Skoger municipality council from 1922 to 1940.

He spent his professional career in the Norwegian State Railways.

References

1887 births
1957 deaths
Labour Party (Norway) politicians
Members of the Storting
Vestfold politicians
20th-century Norwegian politicians
People from Nes, Buskerud